Liga 3 (English: League Three) is the lowest tier in Indonesian football league system. Formed as Liga Nusantara in 2014, this league occupies the third  tier and consists of 2 rounds: provincial qualification—held in every provinces in Indonesia, and national round, competed by provincial qualifiers (number varies between provinces).

History
The competition was established after Liga Indonesia Second Division and Liga Indonesia Third Division merged in 2014. Starting in 2015, the Liga Indonesia First Division was also merged with Liga Nusantara making it the third-tier level in Indonesian football system.
Persatu Tuban won the competition's first season.

In 2017, Liga Nusantara was renamed to Liga 3, along with Indonesian Super League and Indonesian Premier Division which were renamed to Liga 1 and Liga 2, respectively.

Format
The system that will be used in Liga 3 is a full competition with a home-away format. Each participating club is required to compete at least 15 times during the competition season. This is different from previous amateur competitions where the number of matches per club can be uneven. There are those who can compete more than 10, but there are also those who only competed 2 times.

Provincial round
Each province will hold a provincial round, they are followed by amateur clubs without a limit of participants with different competition formats, the difference in the format is due to the different number of participants in each province. Furthermore, the teams that qualify from the provincial round will compete in Regional round.

Regional round 
Participants are teams that have passed the Provincial round and held in 7 regional regions:
 Sumatra
 Java
 Kalimantan
 Sulawesi
 Lesser Sunda Islands
 Maluku Islands
 Papua
The competition system is a knockout system (home and away) to get 32 slots in the National round.

National round 
A total of 32 teams will enter this round. In this first round, 32 teams are divided into eight groups (4 groups in the West region and 4 groups in the East region). Each group is played on a home tournament basis. Winner and runner-up of each group advance to the second round.
The second round features 16 teams which are the winners and runners-up from each group of the first round. Each winner advances to the third round.
In the third round, eight teams are divided into two groups. Each group is played on a home tournament basis. The three best teams of each group are promoted to the Liga 2. The winner of each group also advances to the final.

Championship history

Awards

Best players

Top scorers

References 

 

 
Sports leagues established in 2014
3
Indonesia
2014 establishments in Indonesia
Professional sports leagues in Indonesia